Harinath Majumdar (22 July 1833 – 16 April 1896), better known as Kangal Harinath, was a Bengali journalist, poet and Baul singer.

Early life and career
Harinath was born in Kumarkhali village, Kushtia District, now in Bangladesh. He took up journalism to promote the cause of the poor and oppressed. He started writing in the Sangbad Prabhakar and in 1863 started publishing a journal, Gram Barta Prokashika. The journal was funded by Swarnakumari Devi. In 1873 Harinath set up a printing press for printing this journal.

He was a disciple of Lalon Shah. He established a Baul group named Kangal Fakir Chander Dal (Group of the Penniless Fakir Chand) in 1880. His songs had a profound influence on many thinkers of the day, including Rabindranath Tagore and Akshay Kumar Maitreya.

On his death, the Indian Mirror commented "The district of Nuddea has lost one of its great men".

Notable works
Harinath wrote 18 books. Some of his works are:
 Bijoy Basanta (1859)
 Charu-Charitro (1863)
 Kavita Kaomudi (1866)
 Okkrur Sangbad (1873)
 Chittachapala (1876)
 Kangal-Fakir Chand Fakirer Gitabali (1293-1300 Bengali Year)

References

1833 births
1896 deaths
Bengali male poets
Bengali musicians
19th-century Bengali poets
19th-century Indian male writers